Paul Driessen may refer to:
Paul Driessen (lobbyist) (born 1948), American author and lobbyist
Paul Driessen (animator) (born 1940) Dutch film director, animator and writer